Starring Jo Stafford is a 1953 album by Jo Stafford, with Paul Weston and His Orchestra accompaniment by The Starlighters and The Pied Pipers. The album was re-released in 1997 on a CD along with Autumn in New York by EMI.

Track listing 

 "Serenade of the Bells" (Kay Twomey, Al Goodhart, Al Urbano)       
 "On the Alamo" (Isham Jones, Gus Kahn)
 "No Other Love"  (Paul Weston, Bob Russell)      
 "Red River Valley" (trad. arranged by Paul Weston)
 "Ivy" (Hoagy Carmichael)
 "Fools Rush In" (Rube Bloom, Johnny Mercer)      
 "A Sunday Kind of Love" (Barbara Belle, Anita Leonard, Stan Rhodes, Louis Prima) - 2:51      
 "The Gentleman Is a Dope" (Richard Rodgers, Oscar Hammerstein II) - 2:45
 "Symphony" (Alex Alstone, Jack Lawrence, Andre Gaston Isaac Tabet, Roger Bernstein)
 "Tumbling Tumbleweeds" (Bob Nolan)       
 "You Keep Coming Back Like a Song" (Irving Berlin)       
 "Day by Day" (Axel Stordahl, Paul Weston, Sammy Cahn)

References 

1953 albums
Jo Stafford albums
Capitol Records albums
Albums arranged by Paul Weston
Albums conducted by Paul Weston